Following is a list of teams on the 2010–11 World Curling Tour, which was part of the 2010-11 curling season. Only the skips of the teams are listed.

Men

Women

References
World Curling Tour: Women's teams
World Curling Tour: Men's teams

Teams
2010 in curling
2011 in curling
World Curling Tour teams